Amrutlal is an Indian masculine given name. Notable people with the name include:

Amrutlal Yagnik, 20th century Indian Gujarati critic, biographer, essayist, editor, and translator
Vipul Amrutlal Shah (born 1973), Indian film producer and director

Indian masculine given names